"Rjana Łužica" (Lower Sorbian: Rědna Łužyca; lit. “Beautiful Lusatia”) is the Sorbian national anthem. It was written by poet Handrij Zejler. The lyrics were firstly published on August 24, 1827, in the Leipzig magazine Serbska Nowina. Its music was composed in the beginning of 1845 by Korla Awgust Kocor. The anthem was publicly performed for the first time on October 17, 1845, in Budyšin/Bautzen (Upper Sorbian Budyšin, Lower Sorbian: Budyšyn), German Bautzen, formerly Budissin).

Lyrics 

Handrij Zejler's two additional verses have been excluded from the official version.

References 
 English translation by Reinhard F. Hahn (http://lowlands-l.net/anniversary/serbscina-info.php, http://lowlands-l.net/gallery/hahn_rjana-luzica.php)

Sorbian culture
National anthems
Regional songs
European anthems